Shizuru (written: 静流 or 志弦) is a feminine Japanese given name. Notable people with the name include:

, Japanese manga artist
, Japanese manga artist

Fictional characters
, a character in the anime series My-HiME
, a character in the manga series Mokke
, a character in the manga series Ga-Rei
, a character in the manga series Tenjho Tenge
, a character in the manga series Yu Yu Hakusho
, a character in the visual novel Nil Admirari no Tenbin: Teito Genwaku Kitan
, a character in the anime series BBK/BRNK

Japanese feminine given names